Hortonville is an unincorporated community in Washington Township, Hamilton County, Indiana, United States.

History
A post office was established at Hortonville in 1883, and remained in operation until it was discontinued in 1933. The community's namesake, John B. Horton, served as first postmaster.

References

Unincorporated communities in Hamilton County, Indiana
Unincorporated communities in Indiana
Indianapolis metropolitan area